The African Telecommunications Union (ATU) is an organization in Africa that combines countries and mobile telecommunications providers in an attempt to dramatically increase development of the continent's information and communication technology (ICT) infrastructure.

Mission of the ATU
Like many telecommunications unions, the ATU advocates for increased information development within their region of interest, the continent of Africa. The ATU aims to ensure transparency and accountability, effective funding and financing, and quality service to all with whom it collaborates.  In addition to goals for inclusion within the information society and specifically among African nations, the ATU promotes positive collaboration with the Institute for Computer Technology research and development.  As the Internet has recently become the preeminent communication technology for fostering economic growth, this area is of great focus for the ATU.  Because the Internet reaches 0.1 percent of Africa’s population, the ATU attempts to address the connectivity gap among the nations in Africa and strives for universal access throughout Africa. In achieving this goal, the ATU hopes to be a meaningful player in the development and progression of Africa as a significant contributor to the global information and knowledge society.

History
The foundation of the ATU dates back to 1977 when its mission was a part of the Organization of African Unity (OAU), which has since been replaced by the African Union (AU).  The ATU was officially formed in 1999 as the successor to the Pan-African Telecommunications Union (PATU) and is headquartered in Kinshasa, Democratic Republic of Congo, but due to war, the ATU has relocated to Nairobi, Kenya.  At this time, the organization slightly transformed from primarily a coordinating body for government related activity to include private and public stakeholders in the information and telecommunications technology sector.  The ATU now enforces a constitution and has added a secretary general along with a technical management team to ensure a more effective transformation from the PATU.  Currently, the ATU attempts to provide a collaborative atmosphere for public and private stakeholders to formulate and negotiate policies that might increase the role of Africa in the booming environment of ICT. So, while the PATU previously only allowed public membership of government’s, the ATU now allows organizations from the private sector to become associate members.

Obstacles to ATU Mission
Many problems face the African continent in the area of ICT development.  The cost of computers and information services are very high.  Much of this is caused by the lack of infrastructure in place to manufacture advanced technologies and the limited development of ICT networks.  Moreover, the networks in Africa, including both telephone and Internet infrastructure, are owned by American and European providers.  Additionally, many of the brightest researchers and scientists in Africa are leaving the continent to pursue intellectual and trade development in other countries of the world, because the opportunities for professional development in Africa are limited.  As a result, research and development within Africa lacks significantly, and education of the region’s population continues to slow.

Organizational structure
The ATU has 46 member states and 16 associate members.  The 46 member states include:

Central Africa (10)

 Angola
 Burundi
 Cameroon
 Central African Republic
 Chad
 Congo
 Democratic Republic of Congo
 Equatorial Guinea
 Gabon
 São Tomé and Príncipe

East Africa (6)

 Comoros
 Kenya
 Madagascar
 Mauritius
 Tanzania
 Uganda

Horn of Africa (3)

 Djibouti
 Ethiopia
 Somalia

North Africa (7)

 Algeria
 Egypt
 Libya
 Mauritania
 Morocco
 Sudan
 Tunisia

West Africa (14)

 Benin
 Burkina Faso
 Ivory Coast
 Gambia
 Ghana
 Guinea
 Guinea Bissau
 Liberia
 Mali
 Niger
 Nigeria
 Senegal
 Sierra Leone
 Togo

Southern Africa (7)

 Botswana
 Eswatini
 Lesotho
 Malawi
 South Africa

 Zambia
 Zimbabwe

The 16 associate members include:

 Cameroon Telecommunications (CAMTEL)
 Ivory Coast Telecom
 Sudan Telecom Company Limited (SUDATEL) - Sudan
 Loteny Telecom - Ivory Coast
 Botswana Telecommunications Authority (BTA) - Botswana
 Safaricom Limited - Kenya
 Telkom Kenya Ltd - Kenya
 Telecom Lesotho (PTY) Ltd - Lesotho
 P.Q. Africa - South Africa
 Vodacom (PTY) Limited - South Africa
 Zanzibar Telecom Limited (ZANTEL) - Tanzania
 Tanzania Telecommunications Company Limited (TTCL) - Tanzania
 Ghana Telecommunications Company Ltd - Ghana
 Mauritius Telecom Ltd - Mauritius
 Telecom Egypt - Egypt
 INFOTEL Consulting - Nigeria
from ATU home

Any private entity in the ICT sector may apply for membership whether or not it is affiliated with a host country in the African Union. Nearly any type of entity involved in network technology may apply including banks, universities, consulting agencies, broadcasters, network operators, etc.

The ATU is divided into five principal parts: the Conference of Plenipotentiaries (CPL), the Administrative Council, the Technical and Development Conference, the General Secretariat, and Non-Permanent Units.  The CPL occurs on a four-year cycle, which is attended by the Ministers of Communications, and has the authority to adapt the constitution and is the major policy platform.  The CPL also elects the secretary general and members of the Administrative Council.  The Administrative Council meets annually and approves the policy actions and budgets.  The Technical and Development Conference serves as a platform for setting ICT standards and regulatory measures among the public and private members.  Financial issues and a top-down representational approach have been some of the criticized structural issues for the ATU.

Major Reforms/Initiatives
Because the ATU’s formal establishment is rather young, there have not been many major reforms.  The ATU is in the process of collaborating with regional economic associations and attempting to bolster confidence in a united African effort for the advancement of ICT.  Recently the ATU signed a “cooperation agreement” with the Intergovernmental Authority on Development, the Regional African Satellite Communications Organization and other regional economic organizations.  Historically, leaders of various African nations have been protective of resources, power, and sovereignty resulting in limited progress for the continent.  However, the ATU works actively to encourage cooperation for ICT development.

See also
Asia-Pacific Telecommunity (APT)
European Conference of Postal and Telecommunications Administrations (CEPT)
Inter-American Telecommunication Commission (CITEL)

Notes

References
 Commission for Africa Report  (2005)
 United Nations. United Nations: Human Development Report. New York: Oxford University Press, 2005.

External links
 
 Tel: +254 20 4453308, 4453358; Fax: +254 20 4453359

Telecommunications Union
Telecommunications organizations
Telecommunications in Africa